The 2009–10 European football season was the 106th season of Sport Lisboa e Benfica's existence and the club's 76th consecutive season in the top flight of Portuguese football. The season ran from 1 July 2009 to 30 June 2010; Benfica competed domestically in the Primeira Liga, Taça de Portugal and Taça da Liga. The club also participated in the UEFA Europa League after qualifying from the competition's play-off round, which they had to play as a result of finishing third in the previous season.

On 16 June 2009, Jesus replaced Quique Sánchez Flores at the helm of Benfica. Jesus implemented a 4–1–3–2 formation, in which a winger, Ramires, provided cover and assistance to the defensive midfielder, Javi García, and other winger, Ángel Di María, conducted the counterattacks. Pablo Aimar, as an attacking midfielder, distributed play and Javier Saviola created space between lines for Óscar Cardozo, Aimar and Di María.

This fast-paced, attractive football proved to be successful and in his first year Jesus led Benfica to the first division title after a five-year wait (only two league defeats, 78 goals scored), also reaching the quarterfinals in the Europa League, losing to Liverpool on a 3–5 aggregate score (this would be the last match Benfica would lose in a run that lasted 27 games).

Benfica won their 32nd Primeira Liga and their second League Cup. They saw the definite breakthroughs of Ángel Di María, David Luiz and Fábio Coentrão, while Óscar Cardozo had his best season yet, scoring 26 league goals. The team's only disappointments of the season were a 4–1 loss to Liverpool at Anfield in the Europa League quarter-finals second leg, where Fernando Torres hit two second-half goals to knock Benfica out of Europe, and an early exit at the Taça de Portugal.

Competitions

Pre-season friendlies

Regular season friendlies

Primeira Liga

League table

Results by round

Matches

Taça de Portugal

Taça da Liga

Group stage

Semi-finals

Final

UEFA Europa League

Play-off round

Group stage

Knockout phase

Round of 32

Round of 16

Quarter-finals

Overall record

Player statistics 

|-
! colspan="15" style="background:#dcdcdc; text-align:center;"| Goalkeepers

|-
! colspan="15" style="background:#dcdcdc; text-align:center;"| Defenders

|-
! colspan="15" style="background:#dcdcdc; text-align:center;"| Midfielders

|-
! colspan="15" style="background:#dcdcdc; text-align:center;"| Strikers

|}

Transfers

In

Summer

Winter 

Spend :  €32.4M

Out

Summer

Winter 

 Transfer income:  €6.83M

Overall transfer activity

Spending
 Summer:  €25,300,000
 Winter:  €7,100,000
 Total:  €32,400,000

Income
 Summer:  €6,730,000
 Winter:  €100,000
 Total:  €6,830,000

Expenditure
 Summer:  €18,570,000
 Winter:  €7,000,000
 Total:  €25,570,000

References

Filmography

S.L. Benfica seasons
Benfica
Portuguese football championship-winning seasons